"Respect Yourself" is a song by American R&B/gospel group the Staple Singers. Released in late 1971 from their album Be Altitude: Respect Yourself, the song became a crossover hit. The Staple Singers' version peaked at No. 12 on the Hot 100, No. 2 on the Hot Soul Singles chart, and is one of the group's most recognizable hits. In 2002, the song was inducted into the Grammy Hall of Fame, and in 2010 it was ranked #468 on the Rolling Stone list of the 500 Greatest Songs of All Time, moving down 4 spots from #464 in 2004.

Writing and recording
The song was written by Stax Records singer Luther Ingram and house songwriter Mack Rice.  Ingram, who was frustrated with the state of the world at the time, told Rice "black folk need to learn to respect themselves."  Rice liked the comment so much that he built a funk groove around it, prepared a demo record, and suggested to record producer Al Bell that the Staple Singers record it. The group agreed.

Bell teamed the group with the Muscle Shoals Rhythm Section of Muscle Shoals, Alabama, musicians who laid down classic tracks for Wilson Pickett and Aretha Franklin, and with engineer/musician Terry Manning for vocals, overdubs, and mixing, in Memphis.  The musicians were Barry Beckett (keyboards), Roger Hawkins (drums), Jimmy Johnson (guitar), and David Hood (bass), with lead vocals by "Pops" and Mavis Staples.   The horns were overdubbed by Manning after the vocals were recorded, and were played by the Memphis Horns led by Andrew Love and Wayne Jackson. The song had resonance for a burgeoning self-empowerment movement for African-Americans during the post-civil-rights movement of the 1970s.  The Staple Singers' long version featured Roebuck "Pops" Staples, nearly 57 at the time, on lead for more than two minutes.

Cover versions

The Kane Gang version

In 1984, English pop trio the Kane Gang covered the song for their 1985 debut album The Bad and Lowdown World of the Kane Gang. Produced by Pete Wingfield and the band, it was released as the third single from the album. This version charted at number 19 in Australia and number 21 in the UK. The Kane Gang's version changes the lyric "If you don't give a heck about the man with the Bible in his hands" to "If you don't give a damn about the man with the Bible in his hands".

Bruce Willis version

In 1986, American actor Bruce Willis (as his fictitious alter-ego Bruno Radolini) began a short-lived singing career. Willis covered "Respect Yourself" for his 1987 album The Return of Bruno, a companion to the HBO special of the same name, which aired shortly after the album's release. Willis' version is based on the Kane Gang's version, sped up a bit. It also features backing vocals by the Pointer Sisters; June Pointer also sings a verse. It was produced by Robert Kraft, and charted in three different countries.

Robert Palmer version

In 1995, English singer Robert Palmer covered the song as a non-album single. Palmer's version reached number 45 in the UK and number 170 in Australia.

Chart performance

Staple Singers' version

The Kane Gang's version

Bruce Willis' version

Robert Palmer's version

References

1971 singles
1984 singles
1987 singles
1995 singles
The Staple Singers songs
Grammy Hall of Fame Award recipients
Songs written by Mack Rice
Songs written by Luther Ingram
1971 songs